Mihkel Kirves (born 6 December 1996) is an Estonian professional basketball player for BC Pärnu of the Latvian-Estonian Basketball League. Standing at 1.98 m (6 ft 6 in), he plays at the small forward position.

Professional career
Kirves debuted in the Korvpalli Meistriliiga (KML) in the 2012–13 season with BC Pärnu. He was named KML Best Defender in 2017 and 2018.

National team career
Kirves made his debut for the Estonian national team on 13 September 2018, in a 2019 FIBA Basketball World Cup European qualifier against Germany, scoring 2 points in a 43–86 home defeat.

Awards and accomplishments

Individual
2× Estonian League Best Defender: 2017, 2018

References

External links
Mihkel Kirves at basket.ee
Mihkel Kirves at fiba.com

1996 births
Living people
Basketball players from Tallinn
Estonian men's basketball players
Small forwards
Korvpalli Meistriliiga players
KK Pärnu players